Şambayadı, Çukurova is a neighborhood in the District of Çukurova, Adana Province, Turkey.

References

Villages in Seyhan District